Conopleura latiaxisa is a species of sea snail, a marine gastropod mollusk in the family Drilliidae.

Description
Its shell is relatively small for the genus, around 11 mm in length, slender shaped, thick, solid and semi-fusiform, early four whorls elate, acuminate spire, well swollen periphery. The body whorl is half of the shell length, with a protoconch of about 1.5 whorls. The teleoconch consists of around 5 to 6 convex whorls with a tall spire. Narrow axial ribs reach from suture to suture.

Distribution
The species is only known from the type locality, which is situated between 180 and 250 m deep, near Mactan Island, Cebu, the Philippines.

Habitat
The species lives on sandy mud with small gravel.

Etymology
The word "latiaxisa" refers to the particular characteristics of trigonal spines, which reminds one of the genus Latiaxis in the subfamily Coralliophiliinae in the Muricidae.

References

External links
 
  Nappo A., Rey X., Pellegrinii D., Bonomolo G., & Crocetta F., 2018 - Revisiting the disjunct distribution of Conopleura Hinds, 1844. Zootaxa 4392 (3)

latiaxisa
Gastropods described in 2011
Molluscs of the Philippines